Frederick of Cieszyn (b. 1480/83 - d. June 1507), was a Polish prince member of the House of Piast in the Cieszyn branch.

He was the eldest son of Casimir II, Duke of Cieszyn, by his wife Johanna of Poděbrady, daughter of Victor, Duke of Münsterberg, Duke of Opawa.

Life
Despite the fact that he was the firstborn child of Duke Casimir II, and for unknown reasons, Frederick was destined for a Church career, which was probably in order to increase Casimir II's prestige and power over Silesia. In 1501, supported by his father and other Silesian Dukes, Frederick was a candidate to the office of Auxiliary Bishop of Wrocław, with the right of succession as titular Bishop after the death of the current holder of the Bishopric, Jan IV Roth. However, Frederick's nomination was rejected by the Chapter, mainly because Casimir II's unfavorable politics against the Church during his rule as Starost General of Silesia. Despite the initial protest of Casimir II the Chapter didn't change his opinion, and in 1503 he decided sent his son to Vienna, where shortly after Frederick was named Rector of the local University. Then he went to Italy, where Frederick began his studies. Despite the rejection of his candidacy in 1501 Frederick continue with his efforts to obtain the highest spiritual authority in Silesia and in 1506, with the help of his father, he was appointed Provost of the Kolegiata of the Holy Cross and Dean of the Chapter in Wrocław. Frederick's promising career was brutally interrupted in June 1507, when he died unexpectedly in Italy. He was buried in the Cathedral of Siena.

Ancestry

References
This article was translated from his original in Polish Wikipedia.

1480s births
1507 deaths
Piast dynasty